"Pikanchi Double" (stylized as PIKA★★NCHI DOUBLE) is the twelfth single of the Japanese boy band Arashi. The single was released on 18 February 2004 in two editions: a regular edition containing the karaoke versions of all the songs released in the single, and a limited edition with a deluxe cover art and a bonus track.

Single information
"Pikanchi Double" was used as the theme song for the direct-to-video movie Pikanchi: Life is Hard Dakara Happy, the sequel to the group's first movie together. The single's typography is also modified to denote it as a sequel, with two glyphs filling a void, instead of a single glyph with a void in the middle as seen in the typography of "Pikanchi".

Track listing

Charts and certifications

Charts

Sales and certifications

References

External links
 Pikanchi Double product information 
 Pikanchi Double Oricon profile 

Arashi songs
2004 singles
Oricon Weekly number-one singles
Japanese film songs
Songs written by Sho Sakurai